Peter Newman (born October 2, 1942) is an American voice actor, known for his work with Rankin/Bass.

Career

In ThunderCats he provided the voices of Tygra, Wilykat, Bengali, and Monkian. In SilverHawks he provided the voices of Quicksilver, Mumbo Jumbo, and Timestopper. He also played the evil Duke of Zill & Wack Lizardi in Felix the Cat: The Movie. In 1987, Newman also provided the voice of the camp director of Camp Mimi-Mon for the Rankin/Bass show Mini Monsters.

Filmography

Film

Television

 1985 - ThunderCats - Ho!: The Movie - Tygra / Wilykat / Bengali
 1985 - The Life & Adventures of Santa Claus - Peter Knook / Awgwas / The Gnome King  
 1986 - Silverhawks - Mumbo Jumbo / Quicksilver / Timestopper
 1985–1986 - ThunderCats - Tygra / Wilykat / Monkian 
 1987 - The Comic Strip 
 1987 - TigerSharks - Mako/Wall-Eye
 1992 - Noel 
 2004 - Fillmore! - Eric Orben / Patrol Sheriff 
 2005 - Extreme Makeover - Narrator 
 2009–2012 - Archer - Maj. Nikolai Jakov

Video games

 2012 - The Darkness II - Darkling

References

External links

Audio Interview (2008)

1942 births
Living people
American male voice actors
American male video game actors